Megachile subcingulata is a species of bee in the family Megachilidae. It was described by Padre Jesus Santiago Moure in 1945.

References

Subcingulata
Insects described in 1945